The 'OMEGA' memorandum of March 28, 1956, was a secret United States informal policy memorandum drafted by Secretary of State John Foster Dulles for President Dwight D. Eisenhower. The goal was to reduce the influence in the  Middle East of Egypt's President Gamal Abdel Nasser because he seemed to be leaning in favor of the Soviet Union, and he failed to provide the leadership that Dulles and Eisenhower had desired towards settling the Arab–Israeli conflict. The memoranda contained possible options but it was never formally endorsed or put into effect.

The document planned to create restrictions of Eisenhower's 1954 Food for Peace program and other economic aid, delay and eventual cancellation of Aswan Dam funding, and the beginnings of a search for new leaders in the Arab world to use for peace promotion. However, the memo explicitly leaves policy room for Nasser's rehabilitation as a U.S. regional ally; it aimed at Nasser's marginalization but not his 'destruction'—a marked difference to the correspondent British regional policy review of the same month, which focused on removing Nasser from power and was operationalized in the Suez Crisis of October-November, 1956.

Keith Kyle, a British journalist and scholar, argues that Omega sought to promote Saudi Arabia's King Saud as the dominant Arab leader Cohen points out that after Egypt recognized Communist China, the Eisenhower administration decided that the Omega Plan was not working and that Nasser seemed to be drawing nearer to the Soviets. The Omega plan was dropped and the U.S. ended talks about financing Egypt's much-desired Aswan Dam.

Notes

Further reading
 Kyle, Keith. Suez: Britain's End of Empire in the Middle East (2011) pp 99–101
 Oren, Michael B. Power, faith, and fantasy: America in the Middle East, 1776 to the present (2008)

Egypt–United States relations
1956 in Egypt
1956 in the United States
1956 in international relations
1956 documents